Luis García Martín (born 1962), known as Luisgé Martín, is a Spanish writer. He was born and raised in Madrid, and attended Complutense University. Influenced by Borges and Cortazar, he published his first book of stories in 1989. He has since written more than a dozen works of fiction and non-fiction. His most recent novel Cien noches won the Premio Herralde de Novela in 2020.

References

Spanish novelists
1962 births
Living people
Date of birth missing (living people)
Complutense University of Madrid alumni
Writers from Madrid